John Freeman VC (1833 – 1 July 1913) was an English recipient of the Victoria Cross, the highest and most prestigious award for gallantry in the face of the enemy that can be awarded to British and Commonwealth forces.

Background
John Freeman was born in Sittingbourne, Kent in 1833. He died in Hackney, east London on 1 July 1913 and was buried in Abney Park Cemetery, Stoke Newington.

Military career
Freeman was approximately 25 years old, and a private in the 9th Lancers (The Queen's Royal) Regiment, British Army during the Indian Mutiny when he was awarded the VC for an act of conspicuous bravery at Agra.

The despatch from Major-General Sir James Hope Grant, KCB, dated 8 April 1858 reads:

In The London Gazette dated 3 August 1858, the Nominal Return of Casualties, in action, in Her Majesty's Troops at Bareilly, on 5, 6 and 7 May 1858 indicates that Freeman was "dangerously wounded".

His VC is on display in the Lord Ashcroft Gallery at the Imperial War Museum, London.

References

1832 births
1913 deaths
9th Queen's Royal Lancers soldiers
British Army recipients of the Victoria Cross
British recipients of the Victoria Cross
Indian Rebellion of 1857 recipients of the Victoria Cross
People from Sittingbourne